Sugar Ray Leonard vs. Roberto Durán, billed as The Brawl in Montreal,  was a welterweight professional boxing match contested between WBC and The Ring champion Sugar Ray Leonard and former undisputed lightweight champion Roberto Durán. The bout took place on June 20, 1980 at the Olympic Stadium in Montreal, Canada. Durán defeated Leonard via unanimous decision. The referee was Carlos Padilla Jr.

Background
On May 9, 1980, the highly anticipated fight between the undefeated reigning WBC champion "Sugar" Ray Leonard and former undisputed lightweight champion and the-then number-one ranked welterweight contender Roberto Durán was announced. The bout, which was to take place a little over a month after its official announcement on June 20, would take place at Montreal's Olympic Stadium, the site where Leonard had captured the Olympic gold medal four years prior. Going into the fight, both Leonard and Durán were two of the top fighters in the sport, Leonard was perfect 27–0 and had captured the WBC welterweight title the previous December after knocking out future hall-of-famer Wilfred Benítez and then made a successful first defense against Dave Boy Green in March 1980. Durán had recently completed a six-year run as lightweight champion before moving up to welterweight where he compiled an 8–0 record before facing Leonard. The fight was set to be the highest grossing in boxing history and both Leonard and Durán were to make the biggest paydays in their careers at $9 million and $1.5 million respectively.

Just prior to the bout, both Leonard and Durán would receive health scares. Durán underwent a two-hour heart exam and after his EKG revealed an abnormality in his heartbeat, a cardiologist was called in and determined that the abnormality was common in a well-trained athlete and Durán was cleared to fight. Leonard, meanwhile, claimed that he had been stricken by a "virus", though his trainer stated "If he had a virus, it wasn't that bad or I would have heard of it."

The fight
In a hard-fought, back-and-forth contest that went the full 15 rounds, Durán was the aggressor often throughout the fight, and he was able to earn a close unanimous decision victory. Durán would both land and throw more punches for a 35% success rate, while Leonard, who abandoned his usual slick boxing style and went toe-to-toe with Durán, landed 273 of 753 for a 36% rate. Whilst, Leonard would make adjustments late in the fight, Durán had built a large enough lead by that point in the fight. When the decision was announced, Durán was incorrectly announced as a winner by majority decision as one judge's scorecard was erroneously tabulated as a 147–147 draw, however the mistake was discovered and Durán would win on all three scorecards with scores of; 145–144, 148–147 and 146–144.

Fight card

See also
 Roberto Durán vs. Sugar Ray Leonard II
 Sugar Ray Leonard vs. Roberto Durán III

References

1980 in boxing
Duran
Boxing in Canada
June 1980 sports events in North America
Nicknamed sporting events